Collix basicristata is a moth in the  family Geometridae. It is found on Flores.

References

Moths described in 1923
basicristata